The River of Romance is a 1916 silent film drama directed by Henry Otto and distributed by Metro Pictures. The film starred Harold Lockwood and May Allison.

Cast
Harold Lockwood - William Kissam Kellogg, aka Sam
May Allison - Rosalind Chalmers
Lester Cuneo - Reginald Williams
A. H. Busby - Henry Davidson (*as Bert Busby)
Lee Walker - Stephen Witherbee
Mathilde Brundage - Mrs. Stephen Witherbee (*as Mrs. Mathilde Brundage)
Lilliam Halperin - Polly Witherbee
Philip W. Masi - Tom Witherbee (*as Phil Masi)
Dan Hanlon - Butler

Preservation status
A copy is held in the foreign archive, Archives du Film du CNC Bois d'Arcy.

References

External links
 The River of Romance at IMDb.com

1916 films
American silent feature films
Metro Pictures films
Films directed by Henry Otto
Films based on American novels
Silent American drama films
1916 drama films
1910s American films